Bethlehem Night is a 2022 film directed by Jan Svěrák and written by his father Zdeněk Svěrák, who also stars in the film. It is a comedy based on three short stories written by Zdeněk Svěrák's father - Ruslan and Ludmila,Fotograf and Bethlehem Night.

Cast
 Zdeněk Svěrák as Karel Šejnoha (writer)
 Daniela Kolářová as Helena Šejnohová (wife)
 Ondřej Vetchý as automechanik Bakalář (healer)
 Vladimír Javorský as Father
 Jitka Čvančarová as Mother
 Vojtěch Kotek as Mário Písecký
 Tereza Ramba as Vendula Velebová
 Patricia Schumann as Ludmila

References

External links
 

2022 films
2022 comedy films
2020s Czech-language films
Films directed by Jan Svěrák
Films about old age
Czech comedy films
Films with screenplays by Zdeněk Svěrák